Neede is a former municipality and a town in the eastern Netherlands.

On 1 January 2005 the municipality of Neede merged with the municipalities of Eibergen, Borculo and Ruurlo into the municipality of Berkelland.

History 
It was first mentioned between 1164 and 1176 as "de Nede", and means "the low-lying". It developed on the southern flank of a hill along the Deventer to Vreden road. De Kamp is former havezate was built in 1636 for Otto Gansneb. It was redesigned in 1789. In 1840, Neede was home to 864 people.

Former population centres 
Achterveld, Broeke, Hoonte, Lochuizen, Neede, Noordijk, Noordijkerveld and Rietmolen.

Gallery

References

External links
Official Website

Municipalities of the Netherlands disestablished in 2005
Populated places in Gelderland
Former municipalities of Gelderland
Berkelland